1822 in sports describes the year's events in world sport.

Boxing
Events
 18 May — Tom Cribb announces his retirement and relinquishes his English Championship title.  He nominates his protégé Tom Spring as his successor.  Spring offers to fight anyone in England but there are no immediate volunteers.

Cricket
Events
 The roundarm controversy comes to a head when, in the MCC v Kent match at Lord's, John Willes of Kent opens the bowling and is no-balled for using a roundarm action, a style he has attempted to introduce since 1807. Willes promptly withdraws from the match and refuses to play again in any important fixture.
England
 Most runs – E. H. Budd 354 (HS 87)
 Most wickets – John Sparks 27 (BB 5–?)

Horse racing
England
 1,000 Guineas Stakes – Whizgig 
 2,000 Guineas Stakes – Pastille 
 The Derby – Moses
 The Oaks – Pastille  
 St. Leger Stakes – Theodore

References

 
1822